Ichchhakamna is an only rural council located in Chitwan District in Bagmati Province of Nepal.

The rural municipality was formed on 10 March 2017, when Government of Nepal announced 753 local level units as per the new constitution of Nepal 2015. thus the rural municipality came into existence. The rural council was formed merging following former VDCs: Darechok, Chandi Bhanjyang, Kaule and Dahakhani. The rural council is divided into 7 wards and the admin center of the rural council is located at Chandi Bhanjyang

Demographics
At the time of the 2011 Nepal census, Ichchhakamna Rural Municipality had a population of 25,067. Of these, 58.5% spoke Nepali, 21.8% Chepang, 7.4% Magar, 7.1% Gurung, 1.9% Tamang, 0.9% Bhojpuri, 0.8% Newar, 0.3% Hindi, 0.3% Maithili, 0.3% Thakali, 0.3% Urdu, 0.2% Bhujel, 0.1% Rai, 0.1% Tharu,

In terms of ethnicity/caste, 33.4% were Chepang/Praja, 26.8% Gurung, 12.0% Magar, 4.8% Hill Brahmnin, 4.5% Chhetri, 3.9% Tamang, 3.2% Kami, 3.1% Newar, 3.0% Gharti/Bhujel, 1.3% Damai/Dholi, 0.8% Sanyasi/Dasnami, 0.6% Musalman, 0.5% Teli, 0.4% Thakali, 0.3% Rai, 0.2% Kalwar, 0.2% Kathabaniyan, 0.2% Tharu, 0.1% Kumal, 0.1% Majhi, 0.1% other Terai, 0.1% Thakuri, 0.1% Yadav and 0.4% others.

In terms of religion, 61.3% were Hindu, 26.5% Buddhist, 7.9% Christian, 3.6% Prakriti, 0.6% Muslim and 0.1% others.

References

Rural municipalities in Chitwan District
Rural municipalities of Nepal established in 2017